David Burbank (December 17, 1821 – January 21, 1895) was an American dentist and real estate investor. He became a founder and the namesake of Burbank, California.

Early life
Burbank was born on December 17, 1821, in Effingham, New Hampshire.  He had one brother, Franklin Burbank. His family moved to Waterville, Maine, when he was a child. He studied dentistry, and entered into the practice. Burbank moved to San Francisco, California, in 1853, and practiced dentistry there until 1866.

Burbank, California

Burbank moved to Los Angeles in 1866. He bought  of Rancho Providencia on March 20, 1867, from David W. Alexander and Alexander Bell. He united the two tracts and operated it as a sheep ranch. 

In 1873, Burbank sold the right-of-way through the property to the Southern Pacific Railroad. He donated  of land to build a school in 1879, establishing the Providencia School District. In the early 1880s, he stopped raising sheep and rented out the land for farming.

In 1886, Burbank sold both tracts to Providencia Land, Water, and Development Co., of which he was a member, for $150,000. The corporation filed paperwork establishing the "Town of Burbank" on May 1, 1887.

Burbank built a hotel in the town in 1887. He also commissioned the construction of the Burbank Theatre on Main Street in 1888, which was completed in 1893.

Later life and legacy
Burbank and his wife, Clara, had a daughter, named Flora. He continued to practice dentistry until 1872.

Burbank fell ill on January 5, 1895. He died at his home on January 21. He was interred at Angelus-Rosedale Cemetery.

The city of Burbank commissioned a  bronze statue of Burbank from Andrea Favilli. It was dedicated at 1075 West Burbank Boulevard in 2010.

See also
History of the San Fernando Valley

References

External links

1821 births
1895 deaths
Land owners from California
19th-century American landowners
Burbank, California
American dentists
19th-century dentists
People from Carroll County, New Hampshire
Burials at Angelus-Rosedale Cemetery